Gentium  is an open Unicode serif typeface by Victor Gaultney.

Gentium may also refer to :

 Gentium (pharmaceutical company), a former company focused on development of drugs for rare diseases
 Consensus gentium, a fallacious argument that concludes a proposition to be true because many or all people believe it

See also
 Jus gentium, originally the part of Roman law that the Roman Empire applied to its dealings with foreigners
 Lumen gentium, the Dogmatic Constitution on the Church, is one of the principal documents of the Second Vatican Council
 Gentian (disambiguation)